Giorgetti is an Italian surname, derived from Giorgio (George). Notable people with the surname include:

Alberto Giorgetti (born 1967), Italian politician
Alex Giorgetti (born 1987), Italian water polo player
Antonio Giorgetti (1635–1669), Italian sculptor
Daniel Giorgetti (born 1971), British composer
Edoardo Giorgetti (born 1989), Italian swimmer
Ferdinando Giorgetti (1796–1867), composer, violinist, educator and Italian publicist
Florence Giorgetti (born 1944), French stage and film actress
Franco Giorgetti (1902–1963), Italian cyclist
Giancarlo Giorgetti, Italian politician
Giuseppe Giorgetti, Italian sculptor
Héctor Giorgetti (born 1956), former Argentine footballer 
Massimo Giorgetti (born 1959), Italian politician
Roberto Giorgetti (born 1962), Sanmarinese politician
Ugo Giorgetti (born 1942), Brazilian filmmaker

Italian-language surnames
Patronymic surnames
Surnames from given names